Queen Victoria and her close family kept numerous pet animals, including:
 Fatima – a Pug
 Alma – a Shetland pony given by King Victor Emmanuel
 Dandie – a Skye Terrier
 Dash – a Cavalier King Charles Spaniel
 Eos – a greyhound which Prince Albert brought from Germany
 Flora – a Shetland pony given by King Victor Emmanuel
 Goats – Mohammad Shah Qajar, the Shah of Persia, presented Queen Victoria with a pair of Tibetan goats upon her accession to the throne.  From these, a royal goat herd was established at Windsor.  Goats from this herd were then used as regimental mascots by regiments such as the Royal Welch Fusiliers.
 Nero – a greyhound
 Islay – a Skye terrier. Victoria owned Islay for five years and he died after losing a fight with a cat.
 Jacquot – a donkey
 Unknown name – a lory
 Looty – one of the first Pekingese in Britain, stolen from the Xianfeng Emperor of China, from his Chinese Summer Palace, during the Second Opium War
 Marco – a small spitz which was the first of her many Pomeranians.
 Hector – a deerhound
 Noble – the Queen's favourite collie. A statue by Princess Louise is in Osborne House.
 Picco – a Sardinian pony
 Sharp – a collie
 Turi – a Pomeranian who lay on her deathbed at her request
 Coco – An African grey parrot

See also
 Royal corgis
 Horses of Elizabeth II
 Caesar - King Edward VII pet
 Canadian Parliamentary Cats
 Chief Mouser to the Cabinet Office, United Kingdom
 Tibs the Great

References

Queen Victoria
Pets of the British Royal Family